Andrzej Laszczak (born 5 May 1976 in Szczyrk) is a Polish luger who has competed since the late 1990s. A natural track luger, he won four bronze medals in the men's doubles event at the FIL World Luge Natural Track Championships (2000, 2005, 2009, 2011).

Laszczak also two medals in the men's doubles event at the FIL European Luge Natural Track Championships with a silver in 2010 and a bronze in 2002.

References
 
 Natural track European Championships results 1970-2006.
 Natural track World Championships results: 1979-2007

External links
 

1976 births
Living people
Polish male lugers
People from Bielsko County
Sportspeople from Silesian Voivodeship